These are the results of the Men's Light Fly 48 kg  competition in boxing at the 2010 Summer Youth Olympics in Singapore. Preliminaries were held on August 21 at 14:02, semifinals on August 22, at 14:00, 5th place bout on August 23, at 18:00, the bronze medal bout on August 24, at 18:00 and the Final bout on August 25, at 14:00.
Unlike world championships and the Olympic Games, only one bronze medal is awarded.

Medalists

Results

References
 Draw

Boxing at the 2010 Summer Youth Olympics